Cone snails, or cones, are highly venomous sea snails of the family Conidae.

Fossils of cone snails have been found from the Eocene to the Holocene epochs. Cone snail species have shells that are roughly conical in shape. Many species have colorful patterning on the shell surface. Cone snails are almost exclusively tropical in distribution.

All cone snails are venomous and capable of stinging. Cone snails use a modified radula tooth and a venom gland to attack and paralyze their prey before engulfing it. The tooth, which is likened to a dart or a harpoon, is barbed and can be extended some distance out from the head of the snail at the end of the proboscis.

Cone snail venoms are mainly peptide-based, and contain many different toxins that vary in their effects. The sting of several larger species of cone snails can be serious, and even fatal to humans. Cone snail venom also shows promise for medical use.

Distribution and habitat
There are over 900 different species of cone snails. Cone snails are typically found in warm tropical seas and oceans worldwide. Cone snails reach their greatest diversity in the Western Indo-Pacific region. While the majority of cone snails are found in warm tropical waters, some species have adapted to temperate/semi-tropical environments and are endemic to areas such as the Cape coast of South Africa, the Mediterranean, or the cool subtropical waters of southern California (Californiconus californicus).

Cone snails are found in all tropical and subtropical seas. They live on a variety of substrates, from the intertidal zone and deeper areas, to sand, rocks or coral reefs.

Shell
Cone snails have a large variety of shell colors and patterns, with local varieties and color forms of the same species often occurring. This variety in color and pattern has led to the creation of a large number of known synonyms and probable synonyms, making it difficult to give an exact taxonomic assignment for many snails in this genus. As of 2009, more than 3,200 different species names have been assigned, with an average of 16 new species names introduced each year.

The shells of cone snails vary in size and are conical in shape. The shell is whorled in the form of an inverted cone, with the anterior end being narrower. The protruding parts of the top of the whorls, that form the spire, are in the shape of another more flattened cone. The aperture is elongated and narrow with the sharp operculum being very small. The outer lip is simple, thin, and sharp, without a callus, and has a notched tip at the upper part. The columella is straight.

The shells of cone snails are often brightly colored with a variety of patterns. Some species color patterns may be partially or completely hidden under an opaque layer of periostracum. In other species, the topmost shell layer is a thin periostracum, a transparent yellowish or brownish membrane.

Physiology and behavior
Cone snails are carnivorous. Their prey consists of marine worms, small fish, molluscs, and other cone snails. Cone snails are slow-moving, and use a venomous harpoon to disable faster-moving prey.

The osphradium in cone snails is more specialized than in other groups of gastropods. It is through this sensory modality that cone snails are able to sense their prey. The cone snails immobilize their prey using a modified, dartlike, barbed radular tooth, made of chitin, along with a venom gland containing neurotoxins.

Molecular phylogeny research has shown that preying on fish has evolved at least twice independently in cone snails.

Harpoon 

Cone snails use a harpoon-like structure called a radula tooth for predation. Radula teeth are modified teeth, primarily made of chitin and formed inside the mouth of the snail, in a structure known as the toxoglossan radula. Each specialized cone snail tooth is stored in the radula sac, except for the tooth that is in current use.

The radula tooth is hollow and barbed, and is attached to the tip of the radula in the radular sac, inside the snail's throat. When the snail detects a prey animal nearby, it extends a long flexible tube called a proboscis towards the prey. The radula tooth is loaded with venom from the venom bulb and, still attached to the radula, is fired from the proboscis into the prey by a powerful muscular contraction. The venom can paralyze smaller fish almost instantly. The snail then retracts the radula, drawing the subdued prey into the mouth. After the prey has been digested, the cone snail will regurgitate any indigestible material, such as spines and scales, along with the harpoon. There is always a radular tooth in the radular sac. A tooth may be also be used in self-defense when the snail feels threatened.

The venom of cone snails contains hundreds of different compounds, and its exact composition varies widely from one species to another. The toxins in cone snail venom are referred to as conotoxins, and are composed of various peptides, each targeting a specific nerve channel or receptor. Some cone snail venoms also contain a pain-reducing toxin.

Relevance to humans

Risks 

Cone snails are prized for their brightly colored and patterned shells,  which may tempt people to pick them up. This is risky, as the snail often fires its harpoon in self defense when disturbed. The harpoons of some of the larger species of cone snail can penetrate gloves or wetsuits.

The sting of many of the smallest cone species may be no worse than a bee or hornet sting, but the sting of a few of the larger tropical fish-eating species, such as Conus geographus, Conus tulipa and Conus striatus, can be fatal. Other dangerous species are Conus pennaceus, Conus textile, Conus aulicus, Conus magus and Conus marmoreus. According to Goldfrank's Toxicologic Emergencies, about 27 human deaths can be confidently attributed to cone snail envenomation, though the actual number is almost certainly much higher; some three dozen people are estimated to have died from geography cone envenomation alone.

Most of the cone snails that hunt worms are not a risk to humans, with the exception of larger species. One of the fish-eating species, the geography cone, Conus geographus, is also known colloquially as the "cigarette snail", a gallows humor exaggeration implying that when stung by this creature, the victim will have only enough time to smoke a cigarette before dying.

Symptoms of a more serious cone snail sting include intense, localized pain, swelling, numbness and tingling and vomiting. Symptoms can start immediately or can be delayed for days. Severe cases involve muscle paralysis, changes in vision, and respiratory failure that can lead to death. If stung, one should seek medical attention as soon as possible.

Medical use 
The appeal of conotoxins for creating pharmaceutical drugs is the precision and speed with which the chemicals act; many of the compounds target only a particular class of receptor. This means that they can reliably and quickly produce a particular effect on the body's systems without side effects; for example, almost instantly reducing heart rate or turning off the signaling of a single class of nerve, such as pain receptors.

Ziconotide, a pain reliever 1,000 times as powerful as morphine, was initially isolated from the venom of the magician cone snail, Conus magus. It was approved by the U.S. Food and Drug Administration in December 2004 under the name Prialt. Other drugs based on cone snail venom targeting Alzheimer's disease, Parkinson's disease, depression, and epilepsy are in clinical or preclinical trials.

Many peptides produced by the cone snails show prospects for being potent pharmaceuticals, such as AVC1, isolated from the Australian species, the Queen Victoria cone, Conus victoriae, and have been highly effective in treating postsurgical and neuropathic pain, even accelerating recovery from nerve injury.

Geography and tulip cone snails are known to secrete a type of insulin that paralyzes nearby fish by causing hypoglycaemic shock. They are the only two animal species known to use insulin as a weapon. Cone snail insulin is capable of binding to human insulin receptors and researchers are studying its use as a potent fast-acting therapeutic insulin.

Shell collecting 
The intricate color patterns of cone snails have made them one of the most popular species for shell collectors.

Conus gloriamaris, also known as "Glory of the Seas", one of the most famous and sought-after seashells in past centuries, with only a few specimens in private collections. The rarity of this species' shells led to high market prices for the objects, until the habitat of this cone snail was discovered, which decreased prices dramatically.

As jewelry
Naturally occurring, beach-worn cone shell tops can function as beads without any further modification. In Hawaii, these natural beads were traditionally collected from the beach drift to make puka shell jewelry. Since it is difficult to obtain enough naturally occurring cone snail tops, almost all modern puka shell jewelry uses cheaper imitations, cut from thin shells of other species of mollusk, or made of plastic.

Species

Until 2009 all species within the family Conidae were placed in one genus, Conus. Testing of the molecular phylogeny of the Conidae was first conducted by Christopher Meyer and Alan Kohn, and has continued, particularly with the advent of nuclear DNA testing.

In 2009, J.K. Tucker and M.J. Tenorio proposed a classification system consisting of three distinct families and 82 genera for living species of cone snails. This classification is based on shell morphology, radular differences, anatomy, physiology, and cladistics, with comparisons to molecular (DNA) studies. Published accounts of Conidae that use these new genera include J.K. Tucker & M.J. Tenorio (2009), and Bouchet et al. (2011). Tucker and Tenorio's proposed classification system for the cone shells and other clades of Conoidean gastropods is shown in Tucker & Tenorio cone snail taxonomy 2009.

Some experts, however, still prefer to use the traditional classification. For example, in the November 2011 version of the World Register of Marine Species, all species within the family Conidae were placed in the genus Conus. The binomial names of species in the 82 genera of living cone snails listed in Tucker & Tenorio 2009 were recognized by the World Register of Marine Species as "alternative representations". Debate within the scientific community regarding this issue has continued, and additional molecular phylogeny studies are being carried out in an attempt to clarify the issue.

In 2015, in the Journal of Molluscan Studies, Puillandre, Duda, Meyer, Olivera & Bouchet presented a new classification for the old genus Conus. Using 329 species, the authors carried out molecular phylogenetic analyses. The results suggested that the authors should place all cone snails in a single family, Conidae, containing four genera: Conus, Conasprella, Profundiconus and Californiconus. The authors group 85% of all known cone snail species under Conus. They recognize 57 subgenera within Conus, and 11 subgenera within the genus Conasprella.

Taxonomy

 Afonsoconus Tucker & Tenorio, 2013
 Africonus Petuch, 1975
 Afroconus Petuch, 1975
 Ammirales Schepman, 1913
 Asperi Schepman, 1913
 Asprella Schaufuss, 1869
 Atlanticonus Petuch & Sargent, 2012
 Attenuiconus Petuch, 2013
 Austroconus Tucker & Tenorio, 2009
 Bermudaconus Petuch, 2013
 Brasiliconus Petuch, 2013
 Calibanus da Motta, 1991
 Cariboconus Petuch, 2003
 Chelyconus Mörch, 1842
 Cleobula  1930
 Conasprelloides Tucker & Tenorio, 2009
 Coronaxis Swainson, 1840
 Cucullus Röding, 1798
 Cylinder Montfort, 1810
 Cylindrus Deshayes, 1824
 Darioconus Iredale, 1930
 Dauciconus Cotton, 1945
 Dendroconus Swainson, 1840
 Ductoconus da Motta, 1991
 Embrikena Iredale, 1937
 Endemoconus Iredale, 1931
 Erythroconus da Motta, 1991
 Eugeniconus da Motta, 1991
 Floraconus Iredale, 1930
 Gastridium Mödeer, 1793
 Gladioconus Tucker & Tenorio, 2009
 Gradiconus da Motta, 1991
 Hermes Montfort, 1810
 Heroconus da Motta, 1991
 Isoconus Tucker & Tenorio, 2013
 Kermasprella Powell, 1958
 Ketyconus da Motta, 1991
 Kioconus da Motta, 1991
 Lautoconus Monterosato, 1923
 Leporiconus Iredale, 1930
 Leptoconus Swainson, 1840
 Lilliconus Raybaudi Massilia, 1994
 Lithoconus Mörch, 1852
 Magelliconus da Motta, 1991
 Mamiconus Cotton & Godfrey, 1932
 Nitidoconus Tucker & Tenorio, 2013
 Ongoconus da Motta, 1991
 Phasmoconus Mörch, 1852
 Pionoconus Mörch, 1852
 Poremskiconus Petuch, 2013
 Profundiconus Kuroda, 1956
 Stephanoconus Mörch, 1852
 Textilia Swainson, 1840
 Tuliparia Swainson, 1840
 Turriconus Shikama & Habe, 1968
 Virgiconus Cotton, 1945
 Virroconus Iredale, 1930

See also 
 ConoServer, a database of cone snail toxins, known as conopeptides. These toxins are of importance to medical research.
 Conotoxin

References

Further reading 

 
Gmelin, J. F. 1791. Systema naturae per regna tria naturae. Editio decima tertia. Systema Naturae, 13th ed., vol. 1(6): 3021–3910. Lipsiae.
 
Sowerby, G. B., II. 1833. Conus. Conchological Illustrations pls. 36–37
  
 
 
 
 
 
 
Petuch, E. J. 1987. New Caribbean molluscan faunas. [v] + 154 + A1-A4, 29 pls. Coastal Education & Research Foundation: Charlottesville, Virginia
Petuch, E. J. 1988. Neogene history of tropical American mollusks. [vi] + 217, 39 pls. Coastal Education & Research Foundation: Charlottesville, Virginia

External links 

 
 Tucker J.K. (2009). Recent cone species database. September 4th 2009 Edition
 Filmer R.M. (2001). A Catalogue of Nomenclature and Taxonomy in the Living Conidae 1758–1998. Backhuys Publishers, Leiden. 388pp
 Bouchet, P.; Fontaine, B. (2009). "List of new marine species described between 2002–2006". Census of Marine Life.
 Natural History Museum Rotterdam - photos of Conus shells
 Cone snail and conotoxins page
 The Conus Biodiversity website
 ConoServer
 Conidae from worldwide.conchology.com. Scroll down for many photographs.
 Pain-killer comes out of its shell (The Age news article)
 Venomous snails aid medical science (BBC News Article).
 ConeShell Collection Giancarlo Paganelli
 Cone Shells - Knights of the Sea. Alexander Medvedev's collection
 Cone Snail Video - Hunting Footage and Physiology
 Deadly Critters That Might Save Your Life (CNN)
 Baldomero "Toto" Olivera's short talk: Conus Peptides 
 Zonatus Gallery
 
 BBC Nature Video Cone snails are silent assassins of the sea, drugging sleeping fish before poisoning them

 
Conidae
Extant Eocene first appearances
Mollusc common names

hu:Kúpcsigák